The 1944–45 Michigan Wolverines men's basketball team represented the University of Michigan in intercollegiate basketball during the 1944–45 season.  The team finished the season in fifth place in the Big Ten Conference with an overall record of 12–7 and 5–7 against conference opponents.

Bennie Oosterbaan was in his seventh year as the team's head coach.  Robert Geahan was the team's leading scorer with 136 points in 19 games for an average of 7.2 points per game.  Don Lundquist was the team captain.

Statistical leaders

References

Michigan
Michigan Wolverines men's basketball seasons
Michigan Wolverines basketball
Michigan Wolverines basketball